Western Galilee College (Hebrew: המכללה האקדמית גליל מערבי)  is an academic college in northern Israel within the jurisdiction of the city of Akko. It was founded in 1994 on the basis of its predecessor, the Western Galilee Regional College, which was founded in 1972.

See also
List of universities and colleges in Israel

Colleges in Israel